P. erecta may refer to:
 Plantago erecta, a small annual herb species
 Potentilla erecta, the common tormentil, a plant species

See also
 Erecta